Salam TV  is a Ugandan Islamic television network based in Kampala, Uganda. Its under Next Media Services

Location
Its headquarter is located at Next Media Park, Plot 13, summit view Road, Naguru, Kampala, Uganda

Overview 
The channel was launched in June 2015. It started  broadcasting  on 1 June 2015
The  station has programs on  Current Affairs,  religion,  political, Developmental also has a series of  edu-entertainment, Lifestyle,  sports, and entertainment shows.

Programs
Juma
Amaka
Akafubo
Buuza Oyige
Ebyafaayo byobusiraamu
Emboozi mu Quran
Tawhid
Eswallah

References

External links
Salam TV Revives Islam in Uganda
Salam TV

MTN Ne Salaam TV Bagabudde Mu Kisiibo

Television stations in Uganda
English-language television stations
Television channels and stations established in 2015